The Bosnia and Herzegovina Football Cup is a knock-out football competition contested annually by clubs from Bosnia and Herzegovina. The winner qualifies for the UEFA Europa Conference League first qualifying round.

Until the 1999–2000 season, three separated cups were organized. In 1998, for the first time, Bosnia and Herzegovina got its official cup winner after the "Super final" between Sarajevo and Orašje (winners of two different cups). In the 1999–2000 season, the normal cup format was organized for the first time in the Federation of Bosnia and Herzegovina. Since the 2000–01 season, clubs from the entire country have been competing in the Cup.

Prior to 1992, clubs from the Bosnia and Herzegovina territory contested in the Yugoslav Cup.

Winners 1994–2000

NS BIH Cup

Herzeg-Bosnia Cup

Republika Srpska Cup

Football Cup Finals of Bosnia and Herzegovina

In 2000, Željezničar won the final tournament with Sloboda being 1st runner-up and Bosna being 2nd runner-up.

As mentioned above, before 1998, and in 1999, three different cups were played. They were organized on ethnic principles, so every region had its own cup winner.

Performance by club

References

External links
Official website
Bosnian Cup history at Rec.Sport.Soccer Statistics Foundation

 
1
Bosnian Cup